David E. Talbert (born February 10, 1966) is an American playwright, author, and filmmaker. He is a graduate of Morgan State University and attended the New York University film program.

Talbert has won numerous NAACP awards for his work The Fabric of a Man, and a New York Literary Award in 2007 for his musical, Love in the Nick of Tyme. Talbert has also produced a television reality show, Black Stage, in which actors and singers compete to win a part in one of his plays.

Talbert's first film, First Sunday, was released in 2008. The film stars Ice Cube, Tracy Morgan and Katt Williams. More recently, he signed a first look deal with Netflix.

Works

Novels 
 Baggage Claim (2003)
 Love on the Dotted Line (2005)
 Love Don't Live Here No More: Book One of Doggy Tales (2006, with Snoop Dogg)

Plays 

 Tellin' It Like It Tiz (1991–1993)
 Lawd Ha' Mercy (1993–1994)
 What Goes Around Comes Around (1994–1995)
 He Say She Say... But What Does God Say? (1996)
 A Fool And His Money (1997)
 Talk Show Live (1998)
 Mr. Right Now (1998–1999)
 His Woman, His Wife (2000)
 The Fabric Of A Man (2001)
 Love Makes Things Happen (2002)
 Love On Lay-a-way (2003)
 Love in the Nick of Tyme (2009)
 What My Husband Doesn't Know (2011)
 Suddenly Single (2012)
 Another Man Will (2015)

Films

References

External links
 
 

1966 births
20th-century American dramatists and playwrights
African-American dramatists and playwrights
Living people
American film directors
African-American film directors
African-American film producers
African-American screenwriters
American film producers
American male screenwriters
American male dramatists and playwrights
20th-century American male writers
20th-century African-American writers
21st-century African-American people
African-American male writers